Mark Bradley (born 1994/5) is a Gaelic footballer who plays for Killyclogher and the Tyrone county team. He is a playmaker, at corner-forward for his club, though in the half-forward line for his county.

Bradley won a Tyrone Senior Football Championship with his club in 2016.

He won the 2015 All-Ireland Under-21 Football Championship and Ulster Under-21 Football Championship with his county.

Bradley made his senior inter-county debut in a National Football League game against Dublin at Croke Park.

He played in the 2018 All-Ireland Senior Football Championship Final, where he was the only change announced in advance from the semi-final.

He spent a year abroad in 2019. During that time he played for Donegal Boston.

References

1990s births
Living people
Donegal Boston Gaelic footballers
Tyrone inter-county Gaelic footballers